Robert Andrew Lawrence (December 14, 1899 – November 6, 1983) was a Major League Baseball pitcher who played in one game for the Chicago White Sox on July 19, 1924. He pitched in one inning and recorded one strikeout. He allowed one hit, one earned run, and one walk.

External links

1899 births
1983 deaths
Chicago White Sox players
Major League Baseball pitchers
Baseball players from New York (state)
American expatriate baseball players in Canada
Burials in Queens, New York, by place
Montreal Royals players
Sportspeople from Brooklyn
Baseball players from New York City